Rizwan Azam (born 2 February 1985) is a Pakistani badminton player who also play in the Australian circuit, and was the National champion in both Pakistan and Australia. Azam was the men's doubles bronze medalists at the South Asian Games in 2006, 2010 and 2016, also in the team event in 2006 and 2016. At the BWF circuit, he was the men's singles champion in Pakistan International, also won the men's doubles titles in Syria, Maldives, and Pakistan.

Achievements

South Asian Games 
Men's doubles

BWF International Challenge/Series 
Men's singles

Men's doubles

  BWF International Challenge tournament
  BWF International Series tournament
  BWF Future Series tournament

References

External links 
 
 
 
 

1985 births
Living people
Pakistani male badminton players
Badminton players at the 2018 Asian Games
Asian Games competitors for Pakistan
South Asian Games bronze medalists for Pakistan
South Asian Games medalists in badminton
21st-century Pakistani people